Sangtab or Sang Tab may refer to:
 Sangtab, Nur
 Sangtab, Simorgh